Heberty Fernandes de Andrade (born August 29, 1988) is a Brazilian footballer who plays for Thai League 1 club Bangkok United.

In May 2015, Heberty controversially obtained Timorese citizenship, making him eligible to play for Timor-Leste internationally but he did not make his international debut with them.

On 19 January 2017, the Asian Football Confederation declared Heberty and eleven other Brazilian footballers ineligible to represent Timor-Leste.

He is considered one of the top 5 players in Matchday 13 of the Thai League 1 in an article by FOX Sports Asia.

History

Ratchaburi Mitr Phol F.C.
In 2014, Heberty moved to Thai club Ratchaburi Mitr Phol in Thai League 1. He finished his season in Thailand with the league top scorer award with 26 goals.

Muangthong United
In 2017, Heberty signed for Muangthong United.

Eligibility controversy
An inquiry held by the Prime Minister of Timor-Leste in 2016 heard that Heberty was one of seven Brazilian footballers to receive falsified baptism documents from Timor-Leste's Catholic Church, in order to make it appear he was eligible for Timorese nationality.

All seven players are based in Asia, but only one, Juninho, has played for Timor-Leste's controversial national side.

Heberty received his Timorese passport in 2015, despite having no known means of eligibility, such as a family connection, or residency.

Club statistics
Updated to 22 February 2018.

Honours

Club
Muangthong United
Thai League Cup: 2017
Mekong Club Championship: 2017

Individual
Thai Premier League Top score: 2014 (26 Goal)
Thai League T1 Player of the month: August 2014, June 2018, July 2019, August 2022

References

External links
 
 
 

1988 births
Living people
Brazilian footballers
J1 League players
J2 League players
CR Vasco da Gama players
Clube Atlético Juventus players
Associação Desportiva São Caetano players
Paulista Futebol Clube players
Thespakusatsu Gunma players
Cerezo Osaka players
Vegalta Sendai players
Heberty Fernandes de Andrade
Al-Shabab FC (Riyadh) players
Heberty Fernandes de Andrade
Heberty Fernandes de Andrade
Heberty Fernandes de Andrade
Brazilian expatriate footballers
Expatriate footballers in Japan
Expatriate footballers in Thailand
Brazilian expatriate sportspeople in Thailand
Heberty Fernandes de Andrade
Association football forwards
Expatriate footballers in Saudi Arabia
Brazilian expatriate sportspeople in Saudi Arabia
Saudi Professional League players
Footballers from São Paulo (state)